Carlton Reece (11 September 1915 – 17 November 1963) was a Guyanese cricketer. He played in eight first-class matches for British Guiana from 1938 to 1951.

See also
 List of Guyanese representative cricketers

References

External links
 

1915 births
1963 deaths
Guyanese cricketers
Guyana cricketers
Sportspeople from Georgetown, Guyana